619 Triberga is a main belt asteroid discovered on 22 October 1906 by August Kopff at Heidelberg-Königstuhl State Observatory. Since it has an orbit that repeats itself almost exactly every four years with respect to the position of the Sun and Earth, it has been suggested as a way to calculate the mass of the Moon. Triberga was named for the German town of Triberg.

Since it has an absolute magnitude of 9.9, it is roughly 43 km in diameter. It has an opposition apparent magnitude of 13.5.

References

External links
 
 

Background asteroids
Triberga
Triberga
Moon
S-type asteroids (Tholen)
19061022